The 1930–31 Ohio Bobcats men's basketball team represented Ohio University. Butch Grover was the head coach for Ohio. The Bobcats played their home games at the Men's Gymnasium.  They finished the season 12–4.  They won their first Buckeye Athletic Association championship with a record of 7–1.

Schedule

|-
!colspan=9 style=| Regular Season

Source:

References

Ohio Bobcats men's basketball seasons
Ohio
Ohio Bobcats
Ohio Bobcats